Heworth is a residential area in Gateshead, located around  from Newcastle upon Tyne,  from Sunderland, and  from Durham. In 2011, Census data for the Gateshead Metropolitan Borough Council ward of Heworth and Pelaw recorded a total population of 9,100.

History 
The village's name appears in written records from 1091 as Hewarde, later as Hewrtha, and in 1300 as Hewrthe. In common with most villages in the area, Heworth's history has been intertwined with the fortunes of the quarrying and mining industries. Two large quarries operated in the area, one of which was located at Windy Nook, which is now infilled and used as a public recreation area. The other was located at Low Burn, which is now the site of a cemetery. Heworth Colliery occupied a site to the south-east of Windy Nook quarry, with its own connection to the Pelaw Main Waggonway giving access to the Pelaw Main coal staithes on the River Tyne at Bill Quay.

St. Mary's Church has been a centrepoint of Heworth since around AD 684, with the current church building dating from 1822. The graveyard houses the Haddon Tomb (also known as The Babes in the Bed) – an unusual memorial in the shape of a four poster bed, to three of the Haddon children, William, George and their sister, whose name is now illegible. Local legend has it that the three children died in a fire when a candle fell onto their bed, whilst they were sleeping. This is unlikely to have been the case, as their deaths span a period of six years between 1711 and 1717. It was built by their father, Joseph Haddon, a master mason, who died in 1721, aged 42 years.

Demography 
According to the 2011 Census, the Pelaw and Heworth ward has a population of 9,100. The ward is split into three distinct districts:

 Bill Quay (population of 1,525) – Located to the east of King George's Field, and to the north of the A185 road.
 Heworth (population of 5,273) – Located to the south of the Tyne and Wear Metro line.
Pelaw (population of 2,302) – Located to the north of the Tyne and Wear Metro line, and the A185 road.

52.2% of the population are female, slightly above the national average, while 47.8% are male. Only 2.7% of the population were from a black, Asian and minority ethnic (BAME) group, as opposed to 14.6% of the national population.

Data from the 2011 Census found that the average life expectancy in Pelaw and Heworth is 79.1 years for men, and 81.1 years for women. These statistics compare fairly favourably, when compared to the average life expectancy in the North East of England, of 77.4 and 81.4 years, respectively.

Car ownership is lower than the average in the Metropolitan Borough of Gateshead (63.5%), but lower than the national average of 74.2% – with 61.1% of households in the Pelaw and Heworth ward owning at least one car.

Education 
Heworth is served by one primary school, The Drive Community Primary School. In November 2012, the school was rated "good" by Ofsted. Nearby primary schools include Brandling Primary School and Falla Park Community Primary School in Felling, Colegate Community Primary School, Lingey House Primary School and St. Augustine's Catholic Primary School in Leam Lane, and St. Alban's Catholic Primary School in Pelaw.

In terms of secondary education, Heworth is located within the catchment area for Heworth Grange School in Leam Lane. An inspection carried out by Ofsted in January 2017 deemed the school to be "inadequate". Students from the area also attend the nearby Cardinal Hume Catholic School in Wrekenton, rated "outstanding" by Ofsted in January 2014, as well as St. Joseph's Catholic Academy in Hebburn, which was rated "requires improvement" by Ofsted in January 2019.

Governance 
Pelaw and Heworth is a local council ward in the Metropolitan Borough of Gateshead. As of April 2020, the ward is served by three councillors: Ian Patterson, John Paul Dilston and Rosy Oxberry. Heworth is located within the parliamentary constituency of Gateshead. As of April 2020, the constituency is served by MPs Ian Mearns.

Transport

Air 

Bus 
Heworth is served by Go North East's local bus services, with frequent routes serving Gateshead, as well as Newcastle upon Tyne, South Tyneside and Washington.

Rail 
The nearest Tyne and Wear Metro station is located at Heworth. The Tyne and Wear Metro provides a regular service to Newcastle, with trains running up to every 6 minutes (7–8 minutes during the evening and Sunday) between Pelaw and South Gosforth, increasing to up to every 3 minutes at peak times. Heworth is also the nearest rail station, with Northern Trains providing an hourly service along the Durham Coast Line.

Road 
Heworth is dissected by the A184 – a busy route linking South Tyneside with Gateshead and Newcastle upon Tyne. By road, Gateshead can be reached in under 10 minutes, Newcastle in 15 minutes, and Newcastle International Airport in 25 minutes.

References

External links

Populated places in Tyne and Wear
Gateshead